Muhammad Ali and Jean-Pierre Coopman fought a boxing match on February 20, 1976.This was Ali's first boxing bout after Thrilla in Manila. Ali won the fight after knocking out Coopman in the fifth round. In an interview, Coopman denied claims that he had been drinking champagne before the fight, but confirmed that he had drunk some champagne during the fight to help him move faster and to feel euphoric.

The bout took place in Puerto Rico at the Roberto Clemente Coliseum and was televised in the United States live on CBS in front of 40 million viewers.

The Fight
In the ring during the introduction, Coopman smiled easily while Ali stared at him. In his orange robe with a small black lion over the left breast, Coopman sat on the stool in his corner and appeared to enjoy Ali's attempted psych. But when the bell rang for the first round, the Belgian stopped smiling.

Ali had a 20-pound advantage in weight at 226 over 206 and a five-inch advantage in reach, in addition to his advantage in skill and experience. In the first round, he coughed twice midway through the round, then coughed up his mouthpiece near the end of the round. Ali was recovering from a recent battle with the flu.

Through four rounds, Ali was fighting in a flatfoot stance, peppering Coopman with flurries of punches. In the fifth, the champion started to dance, circling to his left, then to his right, and confusing Coopman with backhand jabs. Then Ali threw a big uppercut.

With a combination of punches, culminated by a right uppercut, the 29-year-old challenger toppled into the ropes. Trying to regain his equilibrium, Coopman wobbled back into the canvas in an apparent delayed reaction from the punch. Coopman was counted out by referee Ismael Quinones-Falu at 2 minutes 46 seconds. The referee and the two judges, Ismael Fernandez and Roberto Ranirez, each had rewarded Ali a 10-9 advantage in points in each of the first four rounds.

Moments later, Coopman was dragged to his corner, with Ali helping. About 20 minutes after the bout, Ali appeared in the interview area, dressed and relaxed.

References

Coopman
1976 in boxing
World Boxing Association heavyweight championship matches
World Boxing Council heavyweight championship matches
February 1976 sports events in North America